First-seeded Alice Marble defeated second-seeded Helen Jacobs 6–0, 8–10, 6–4 in the final to win the women's singles tennis title at the 1939 U.S. National Championships. The tournament was played on outdoor grass courts and held from September 7, through September 17, 1939 at the West Side Tennis Club in Forest Hills, Queens, New York.

The draw consisted of 64 players of which eight were seeded.

Seeds
The eight seeded U.S. players are listed below. Alice Marble is the champion; others show in brackets the round in which they were eliminated.

  Alice Marble (champion)
  Helen Jacobs (finalist)
  Sarah Fabyan (quarterfinals)
  Dorothy Bundy (quarterfinals)
  Gracyn Wheeler (first round)
  Helen Bernhard (third round)
  Dorothy Workman (third round)
  Virginia Wolfenden (semifinals)

Draw

Final eight

References

1939
1939 in women's tennis
1939 in American women's sports
Women's Singles
Women's sports in New York (state)
Women in New York City
1939 in New York City
Forest Hills, Queens